Zita Frydrychová (born 3 December 1991) is a trampoline gymnast from the Czech Republic.

Zita competed in the women's trampoline event at the 2012 Summer Olympics where she finished in 15th place.

References

1991 births
Living people
Gymnasts at the 2012 Summer Olympics
Olympic gymnasts of the Czech Republic
Czech female trampolinists
Sportspeople from Liberec
European Games competitors for the Czech Republic
Gymnasts at the 2019 European Games